Arceuthobium douglasii is a species of dwarf mistletoe known as Douglas fir dwarf mistletoe. It is native to western North America from British Columbia to Texas to California, where it lives in forest and woodland as a parasite. It is found mostly on Douglas fir (Pseudotsuga menziesii) trees, but occasionally on fir (Abies spp.), as well.

This greenish shrub is visible as a network of scaly stems extending above the bark of its host tree. Most of the mistletoe is located inside the host tree, attached to it via haustoria, which tap the tree for water and nutrients. The leaves of the mistletoe are reduced to scales on its surface. It is dioecious, with male and female mistletoe plants producing spikes of staminate and pistillate flowers, respectively. The fruit is a sticky berry a few millimeters long which explodes to disperse the seeds it contains several meters away from the parent plant and its host tree.

References

External links
Jepson Manual Treatment
Profile and Photo

douglasii
Parasitic plants
Flora of the United States
Flora of Canada